Opinion polling for the next Czech legislative election started immediately after the 2021 legislative election.

Nationwide polling

Graphical summary

Party polling

Coalition polling

Percentage

Seats

External links 

Next
Czech Republic